The Battle of Gazala (near the village of Gazala) was fought during the Western Desert Campaign of the Second World War, west of the port of Tobruk in Libya, from 26 May to 21 June 1942.

The Axis troops made a decoy attack in the north as the main attack moved round the southern flank of the Gazala position. Unexpected resistance at the south end of the line around the Bir Hakeim box by the Free French garrison, left  with a long and vulnerable supply route around the Gazala Line. Rommel retired to a defensive position backing onto Allied minefields (the Cauldron), forming a base in the midst of the British defences. Italian engineers lifted mines from the west side of the minefields to create a supply route through to the Axis side.

The Eighth Army withdrew from the Gazala Line and the Axis troops overran Tobruk in a day. Rommel pursued the Eighth Army into Egypt and forced it out of several defensive positions. The Battle of Gazala is considered the greatest victory of Rommel's career.

As both sides neared exhaustion, the Eighth Army checked the Axis advance at the First Battle of El Alamein. To support the Axis advance into Egypt, the planned attack on Malta (Operation Herkules) was postponed. The British were able to revive Malta as a base for attacks on Axis convoys to Libya, greatly complicating Axis supply difficulties at El Alamein.

Background

Benghazi

Following Operation Crusader, in late 1941, the British Eighth Army had relieved Tobruk and driven the Axis forces from Cyrenaica to El Agheila. The elimination of Force K from Malta, which ran into an Italian minefield off Tripoli in mid-December and the arrival of  II in Sicily, neutralised Allied air and naval forces in Malta, allowing more Axis supplies to reach Libya. After a two-month delay, German and Italian forces in Libya began to receive supplies and reinforcements in men and tanks, which continued until the end of May, when  II was transferred to the Russian front.

While aware from signals intelligence of these reinforcements, GHQ in Cairo underestimated their significance and Axis fighting strength, having greatly exaggerated the casualties inflicted on the Axis during Operation Crusader. In an appreciation made in January 1942, Auchinleck alluded to an Axis fighting strength of 35,000 men, when the true figure was about 80,000 (50,000 German and 30,000 Italian troops). The Eighth Army expected to be ready by February and GHQ Cairo believed that the Axis would be too weak and disorganised to mount a counter-offensive in the meantime. On 21 January, Rommel sent out three strong armoured columns to make a tactical reconnaissance. Finding only the thinnest of screens, Rommel changed his reconnaissance into an offensive, recaptured Benghazi on 28 January and Timimi on 3 February. By 6 February, the Allies had fallen back to a line from Gazala to Bir Hakeim, a few miles west of Tobruk, from which the Italo-Germans had retired seven weeks before. The Allies had  from 21 January, lost  knocked out, another  damage and breakdowns and forty field guns.

Gazala line

Between Gazala and Timimi, just west of Tobruk, the Eighth Army was able to concentrate its forces sufficiently to turn and fight. The Gazala line was a series of defensive boxes accommodating a brigade each, laid out across the desert behind minefields and wire, watched by regular patrols between the boxes. The line was not evenly manned, with a greater number of troops covering the coast road, leaving the south less protected but the line was behind deep minefields and a longer line would make an attack around the southern flank harder to supply.

Prelude

British preparations

Churchill pressed Auchinleck to attack to push the Axis out of Cyrenaica and relieve the pressure on Malta, which Churchill felt was essential to the war effort,

The Eighth Army received new equipment, including  tanks equipped with 75 mm guns, and large numbers of 6-pounder anti-tank guns. Rommel thought that Allied minefields ended well north of Bir Hakeim and did not know of the "mine marsh" surrounding the box. The Eighth Army was in the process of reorganising, changing the relationship between infantry and artillery, while the RAF commander Arthur Tedder concentrated the efforts of the Desert Air Force (DAF) on supporting the troops on the ground. Army commanders lost the power to direct air operations, which was reserved for the air commanders. A new fighter-bomber concept was developed and Air Vice-Marshal Arthur Coningham, commander of the DAF, moved his headquarters to the Eighth Army HQ to improve communication.

Axis commanders knew that the entry of the United States into the war would give the Eighth Army access to an increase in materiel but sought to forestall an Allied offensive before these supplies could influence events. By late May, the 1st South African Division was on the Gazala line nearest the coast, the 50th (Northumbrian) Infantry Division to the south and the 1st Free French Brigade furthest south at Bir Hakeim. The 1st and 7th Armoured Divisions waited behind the main line as a mobile counter-attack force, the 2nd South African Division formed a garrison at Tobruk and the 5th Indian Infantry Division (which had arrived in April to relieve the 4th Indian Infantry Division) was held in reserve. The Allies had   and

Axis preparations

The  had a much shorter supply line and the British were burdened by an over-extended supply line. II in Sicily had also regained air superiority for the Axis. Rommel asked for another  but this unrealistic demand was rejected and Rommel was warned that an advance would cause another supply crisis. On 29 January, the  recaptured Benghazi and next day ammunition supply to the front line failed. By 13 February, Rommel agreed to stop at Gazala,  from Tripoli.

Until May, monthly deliveries averaged , less than the smaller Axis force received from June–October 1941 but sufficient for an offensive. The Italians tried to restrain Rommel by advocating the capture of Malta, which would postpone another offensive in Africa until the autumn but agreed to an attack on Tobruk for late May. The capture of Malta would not alter the constraints of port capacity and distance; protecting convoys and a large port close to the front, would still be necessary for victory.

Air attacks directed by Kesselring against Malta greatly reduced its offensive capacity, allowing supply convoys from Italy to reach Axis forces in Africa with increased regularity. (Operation Venice), the Axis plan of attack, was for armoured forces to make a flanking manoeuvre south of the fortified "box" at Bir Hakeim. On the left flank, the 132nd Armoured Division "Ariete" would neutralise the Bir Hakeim box and on the right flank, the 21st Panzer Division and 15th Panzer Division would advance north behind the Eighth Army defences, to destroy the Allied armour and cut off the infantry divisions on the Gazala line.

The rest of the Italian XX Motorized Corps, the Italian 101st Motorised Division "Trieste", would open a gap in the minefield north of the Bir Hakeim box near the Sidi Muftah box, to create a supply route to the armour. Rommel anticipated that, having dealt with the Allied armour, he would capture El Adem, Ed Duda, Sidi Rezegh and "Knightsbridge". The Axis tanks would then be in a position to attack on the following day westwards against the Eighth Army defensive boxes between Gazala and Alem Hamza, meeting the eastwards attack by the Italian X and XXI corps. By late May, the Axis forces comprised   and

Battle

Operation Venice

At 14:00 on 26 May, the Italian X and XXI Corps launched a frontal attack on the central Gazala positions, after a heavy artillery concentration, beginning  (Operation Venice). During the day, the bulk of the  moved, to give the impression that this was the main Axis assault. When night fell, the armoured formations turned south in a sweeping move around the southern end of the Gazala line.

The 132nd Tank Infantry Regiment of the "Ariete" Division sent its experienced VIII and IX Medium Tank battalions forward, while the fresh X Medium Tank Battalion was in second line. The 21st Panzer Division was advancing south of the position and did not take part in the action.

Further to the east, the 15th Panzer Division had engaged the 4th Armoured Brigade of the 7th Armoured Division, which had been ordered south to support the 3rd Indian and 7th Motorised brigades. In a mutually costly engagement, the Germans were surprised by the range and power of the  guns on the new M3 (Grant) tanks. The 4th Armoured Brigade then withdrew toward El Adem and spent the night near the Belhamed supply base, east of El Adem.

On the far right of the Axis advance, the 90th Light  Division engaged the 7th Motorised Brigade at Retma and forced it to withdraw eastwards on Bir el Gubi. Resuming their advance toward El Adem before noon, armoured cars of the 90th Light came upon the advanced HQ of 7th Armoured Division near Bir Beuid, dispersing it and capturing a number of officers including the commander, Frank Messervy, who pretended to be a batman and escaped. The "inexcusable" lapse in security left the division without effective command for the next two days. As planned, 90th Light division reached the El Adem area by mid-morning and captured a number of supply dumps. The following day, the 4th Armoured Brigade was sent to El Adem and the 90th Light Division was driven back to the south-west.

The tank battle continued for three days; lacking possession of Bir Hakeim, Rommel drew the  into a defensive position, using the extensive Allied mine belts to block an Allied approach from the west. The British tanks attacked several times from the north and east against accurate defensive fire. The Axis supply situation became desperate; defending the German rear, the Ariete Division repulsed attacks by the British armoured brigades on 29 May and during the first week of June.

Bir Hakeim

The Bir Hakeim box was defended by the 1st Free French Brigade under Marie-Pierre Kœnig. On 27 May, the Italian IX Tank Battalion of the 132nd Tank Infantry Regiment (Ariete Division), which had not been engaged in the destruction of the 3rd Indian Brigade box and had continued to advance alone at full speed, stumbled in the French positions and launched a hasty attack, which was a costly failure against the French  guns and mines. On the night of  the 90th Light and Trieste divisions were sent south to renew the attack on Bir Hakeim, where the battle continued for another ten days.

Reinforced with a further , the Axis attacked Bir Hakeim again on 9 June and overran the defences by the following day. Ritchie ordered the remaining troops to evacuate as best they could, under the cover of darkness. Under fire through the night, many of the French were able to find gaps in the line through which to withdraw.

The Cauldron

On 30 May, Rommel pulled the  back westward against the edge of the minefields, creating a defensive position. A link was formed with elements of the Italian X Corps, which were clearing two routes through the minefields from the west. In the process, the Sidi Muftah box was overrun and the defending 150th Infantry Brigade was destroyed after brutal fighting. At one point, Rommel personally led a platoon of panzer grenadiers in the attack;

Acting on mistaken reports about German tank losses, Auchinleck strongly urged Ritchie to counter-attack along the coast, to exploit the absence of German tanks and break through to Timimi and then Mechili. Ritchie was more concerned by Tobruk, brought reinforcements up to the El Adem box and created new defensive boxes opposite the gaps in the minefield. In the north, XIII Corps made no progress but the attack by 7th Armoured and 5th Indian divisions on the eastern flank of the cauldron at 02:50 initially went well. An important element of the plan was the destruction of the Axis anti-tank screen with an artillery bombardment but because of an error in plotting its position, the bombardment fell too far to the east. When the 22nd Armoured Brigade advanced, it was met by massed anti-tank fire and checked. The 32nd Army Tank Brigade, advancing from the north, joined the attack at dawn but also ran into massed fire, losing fifty of seventy tanks.

The eastward thrust towards Bir el Hatmat dispersed the tactical HQs of the two British divisions, as well as the HQs of the 9th Indian Infantry Brigade, the 10th Indian Infantry Brigade and other smaller units, which caused command to break down. The 22nd Armoured Brigade, having lost  its  was forced from the battlefield by more attacks from the 15th Panzer Division. Three Indian infantry battalions, a reconnaissance regiment and four artillery regiments of the attacking force were left behind, unsupported by armour and overrun. Rommel retained the initiative, maintaining his strength in the cauldron while the number of operational British tanks diminished. A number of probes were sent to test the various opposing strong points and from 6 to 8 June, further attacks were launched on Bir Hakeim and repulsed by the French garrison. The 7th Motor Brigade and 29th Indian Infantry Brigade continued to harass the Axis lines of communications.

Black Saturday, 13 June

On 11 June, Rommel pushed the 15th Panzer Division and 90th Light  Division toward El Adem and by 12 June had begun forcing the 201st Guards Brigade out of the Knightsbridge Box to Tobruk. The 29th Indian Infantry Brigade repulsed an attack on the El Adem box on 12 June but the 2nd and 4th Armoured Brigades on their left were pushed back  by the 15th Panzer Division and had to leave their damaged tanks on the battlefield. On 13 June, the 21st Panzer Division advanced from the west and engaged the 22nd Armoured Brigade. The  demonstrated a superiority in tactics, combining tanks with anti-tank guns in the attack; Rommel acted rapidly on intelligence obtained from Allied radio traffic intercepts. By the end of 13 June, the Knightsbridge box was virtually surrounded and it was abandoned by the Guards Brigade later that night, with their commanding officer Thomas Bevan having been killed the previous day. Due to these defeats, 13 June became known as "Black Saturday" to the Eighth Army.

Rigel Ridge

On 13 June, the 21st Panzer Division attacked Rigel Ridge in the middle of a sandstorm. The Germans overran part of the 2nd Scots Guards at the Knightsbridge Box at the west end of Rigel Ridge, overlooked by the 6th South African Anti-tank battery of the 2nd Field Regiment, Natal Field Artillery and a battery of the 11th Regiment RHA nearby. The South African gunners kept firing until their guns were destroyed, allowing the withdrawal of other Allied formations. The South African battery commander had decided to stay and maintain fire against the German tanks, to delay the Germans for as long as possible. The remaining guns were commanded individually and fired at the Panzers over open sights. The German tanks took up positions behind the ridge, with anti-tank guns placed between them. A column of Panzers attacked from the rear, surrounding them and cutting off all escape and the gunners kept firing until the eight guns had been destroyed. About half the gun detachments were killed and wounded, including the battery commander and many officers. The last gun in action was manned by Lieutenant Ashley and a signaller; when the battery had been silenced, the Axis tanks approached cautiously and the South African gunners were taken prisoner. (The entire Natal Field Artillery Regiment was captured and was not re-formed until after the war.) The Germans captured over  prisoners.

Eighth Army retreat

On 14 June, Auchinleck authorised Ritchie to withdraw from the Gazala Line. The defenders in the El Adem and two neighbouring boxes held on and the 1st South African Division was able to withdraw along the coast road, practically intact. The road could not accommodate two divisions and the remaining two brigades of the 50th (Northumbrian) Division could not retreat eastwards, because of the Axis tanks and attacked south-west, breaking through the lines of the 27th Infantry Division "Brescia" and 17th Infantry Division "Pavia" of X Corps; then headed south into the desert, before turning east. London would not contemplate a withdrawal to the better defensive positions on the Egypt-Libya frontier and on 14 June, Auchinleck ordered to Ritchie to hold a line running south-east from Acroma (west of Tobruk) through El Adem to Bir El Gubi. By the evening of 15 June, the Point 650 box had been overrun and on 16 June, the defenders at Point 187 had been forced by lack of supplies to evacuate. On 17 June, both boxes were evacuated ending any chance of preventing the encirclement of Tobruk. The retreat became known to some as the Gazala Gallop.

Fall of Tobruk

In February 1942, the army, navy and air force commanders-in-chief in Cairo had agreed that Tobruk should not stand another siege. The defences at Tobruk had not been maintained and it was garrisoned by inexperienced troops. Auchinleck viewed the defence of Tobruk as a lesser matter and told Ritchie that he did not intend to hold it at all costs. An immense store of supplies of every description had been accumulated around the port for an Allied offensive and Auchinleck expected it to be able to hold out for two months with the supplies in the fortress. The British prime minister Winston Churchill had placed great store on the symbolic value of Tobruk and there was an exchange of ambiguous signals, leading to the port becoming surrounded and besieged, rather than evacuated as originally planned.

Operation Venice began on 26 May 1942 and drove the Eighth Army east of Tobruk, leaving it vulnerable to attack from the east. Gott garrisoned Tobruk with the two brigades of 2nd South African Division (Major-General Hendrik Klopper) along with the 201st Guards (Motorised) Brigade, 11th Indian Infantry Brigade, 32nd Army Tank Brigade and the 4th Anti-Aircraft Brigade.  penetrated a weak spot on the eastern defensive perimeter and took the port within twenty-four hours. The garrison of 33,000 men was captured, many of those on the western perimeter not having been engaged. The surrender was the largest capitulation of British Empire forces in the war after the Battle of Singapore in February 1942. Later in the year, a Court of Inquiry found Klopper to be largely blameless for the surrender and ascribed the defeat to failures among the British high command. The findings were kept secret until after the war, doing little to restore the reputation of Klopper and his troops.

Aftermath

Analysis

With the capture of Tobruk, the Axis gained a port nearer the Aegean–Crete route and a large amount of Allied supplies. If the Allies could not stop the Germans in Egypt, they would take the Suez Canal (forcing Britain to use supply lines twice as long, threatened by U-boats) and potentially drive for the oilfields in the Middle East. Hitler rewarded Rommel with a promotion to the rank of field-marshal, the youngest German officer ever to achieve this rank. Rommel remarked he would have preferred another panzer division.

Churchill wrote,

Auchinleck dismissed Ritchie on 25 June and assumed command of the Eighth Army for the First Battle of El Alamein, where he stopped Rommel's advance. In August, Auchinleck was replaced as Eighth Army commander by the XIII Corps commander, Lieutenant-General William Gott and as C-in-C Middle East Command by General Sir Harold Alexander. Gott was killed when his aircraft was shot down and Lieutenant-General Bernard Montgomery was appointed as his replacement.

In 2017, James Holland wrote,

Casualties
The Eighth Army lost  wounded or captured, including  taken at Tobruk The Germans suffered , about 15 per cent of their force. Italian casualties were 3,000 men, 125 tanks, 44 armoured cars, 450 motor vehicles, 39 guns and seventy-four  anti-tank guns. On 30 June, the Afrika Korps reported that Axis tank losses were  that only  tanks were operational, the Italian XX Corps was down to fifteen tanks and the 90th Light  Division had only  left. Hundreds of damaged tanks had been left behind when armoured regiments retreated and it was estimated that there were  casualties in 17 days. On 22 June, the Desert Air Force had  aircraft,  them in the Middle East, the Germans  the Italians  another  reserve and  the Mediterranean excluding Italy. The Royal Army Ordnance Corps recovered  up to 19 June, repaired  sent  to Egypt  US-made tanks). The Eighth Army was reduced to about  tanks by the end of the battle and shuffling operational tanks and crews between units disrupted unit organisation. Seven field artillery regiments,  and two tank repair workshops (which had been moved into Tobruk) were lost. By 1 July, the Eighth Army was back at El Alamein, with  tanks,  from workshops and  waiting to be repaired.

Subsequent operations
 began  an advance upon Egypt, while the Eighth Army fell back to El Alamein. Auchinleck decided not to hold Mersa Matruh, choosing to fight a delaying action with X and XIII Corps. The  was delayed at the Battle of Mersa Matruh but signal failures led to disorganisation and the X Corps line of retreat along the coast road being cut off. The corps broke out at night to the south and worked its way around the German positions, collided with Axis forces several times and lost more than  forty tanks and a large quantity of supplies. Auchinleck had ordered the bulk of the Eighth Army to retire another  to El Alamein,  from Alexandria. The retirements brought the Eighth Army closer to its base and the Qattara Depression to the south of El Alamein closed the southern flank. The Allied and Axis forces fought the First Battle of El Alamein, the Battle of Alam el Halfa and the Second Battle of El Alamein.

Orders of battle
Allied and Axis forces, Gazala, 26 May – 21 June 1942

Allies

 Middle East Command (Claude Auchinleck)
Eighth Army (Neil Ritchie)
XIII Corps (William Gott)
 1st South African Division (Dan Pienaar)
 South African 1st Infantry Brigade Group
 South African 2nd Infantry Brigade Group
 South African 3rd Infantry Brigade Group
 2nd South African Division (Hendrik Klopper) (in Tobruk)
 South African 4th Infantry Brigade Group
 South African 6th Infantry Brigade Group
 9th Indian Infantry Brigade Group (Bernard Fletcher) (from 5th Indian Division and moved to 7th Armoured Division at the Cauldron in early June)
 11th Indian Infantry Brigade (Andrew Anderson) (from Army Reserve to replace 9th Indian Infantry Brigade Group)
 50th (Northumbrian) Infantry Division (William Ramsden)
 150th Infantry Brigade Group (Haydon)
 151st Infantry Brigade Group (John Nichols)
 69th Infantry Brigade Group (Hassall)
 1st Army Tank Brigade (O'Carroll)
 32nd Army Tank Brigade (Willison)
XXX Corps (Charles Norrie)
 1st Armoured Division (Herbert Lumsden)
 2nd Armoured Brigade Group (Briggs)
 22nd Armoured Brigade Group (Carr)
 201st Guards Motor Brigade (John Marriott until 17 June then G. F. Johnson)
 7th Armoured Division (Frank Messervy)
 4th Armoured Brigade Group (Gatehouse)
 7th Motor Brigade Group (James Renton)
 3rd Indian Motor Brigade Group (Filose)
 29th Indian Infantry Brigade Group (Denys Reid) from 5th Indian Infantry Division
 1st Free French Brigade Group (Marie Kœnig) (under 7th Armoured Division command when defending Bir Hakeim)

Army Reserve
 5th Indian Infantry Division (Harold Briggs)
 10th Indian Infantry Brigade (Charles Boucher)
 2nd Free French Brigade Group
 10th Indian Infantry Division (Thomas Rees) (arriving from Iraq)
 20th Indian Infantry Brigade (MacGregor)
 21st Indian Infantry Brigade (Purves)
 25th Indian Infantry Brigade (Ronald Mountain)
 11th Indian Infantry Brigade (Andrew Anderson) (from 4th Indian Infantry Division)
 1st Armoured Brigade
 5th Indian Infantry Brigade from mid-June (Dudley Russell) (from 4th Indian Infantry Division)

Axis
Details from Pitt 2001 unless indicated.
  Ettore Bastico

 ( Erwin Rommel)
  ( Walter Nehring)
 15th Panzer Division ( Gustav von Värst [wounded 27 May then Oberst Eduard Crasemann])
 21st Panzer Division ( Georg von Bismarck)
 90th Light Division ( Ulrich Kleemann)
  ( Ettore Baldassarre)
 132nd Armoured Division "Ariete" ( Giuseppe De Stefanis)
 101st Motorised Division "Trieste" ( Arnaldo Azzi)

 (Ludwig Crüwell)
  ( Benvenuto Gioda)
 27th Infantry Division "Brescia" ( Giacomo Lombardi)
 17th Infantry Division "Pavia" ( Antonio Franceschini)
  ( Enea Navarini)
 102nd Motorised Division "Trento" ( Francesco Scotti)
 60th Infantry Division "Sabratha" ( Mario Soldarelli)
 Light Infantry Regiment 155 (detached from 90th Light Division)

See also

 Battle of Bir Hakeim
List of Italian military equipment in World War II
List of German military equipment of World War II
List of British military equipment of World War II
List of French military equipment of World War II
List of equipment of the United States Army during World War II
 North African campaign timeline
 List of World War II Battles

Footnotes

Citations

Bibliography

Books
 
 
 
 
 
 
 
 
 
 
 
 
 
 
 
 
 
 
 
 
 
 
 
 
 
 
 
 
 
 
 
 
 
 
 
 

Journals
 
 

Magazines
 

Websites

Further reading

External links

 German Experiences during The Battle of Gazala
 Italian commanders 1940–1945 (in Italian)
 Parliamentary Debates, House of Commons Official Report 2 July 1942
 Battle of Gazala animated battle map (Mark Cannon)

Conflicts in 1942
1942 in Libya
Western Desert campaign
Libya in World War II
Battles of World War II involving the United Kingdom
Battles and operations of World War II involving South Africa
Battles and operations of World War II involving India
Battles of World War II involving France
Battles of World War II involving the United States
Battles of World War II involving Italy
Battles of World War II involving Germany
Battle honours of the King's Royal Rifle Corps
Erwin Rommel
May 1942 events
June 1942 events